Kase (written: 加瀬) is a Japanese surname. Notable people with the surname include:

, Japanese diplomatic critic
, Japanese judoka
, Japanese professional racing cyclist
, Japanese sport wrestler
 Max Kase (1897–1974), American newspaper editor
, Japanese actor
, Japanese diplomat
, Japanese karate master
, Japanese diplomat
, Japanese voice actor

See also
Kaše, a Czech surname

Japanese-language surnames